The 2021–22 UConn Huskies men's ice hockey season was the 62nd season of play for the program, the 24th at the Division I level, and the 8th season in the Hockey East conference. The Huskies represented the University of Connecticut and were coached by Mike Cavanaugh, in his 9th season.

This was expected to be UConn's final season playing home games at the XL Center in downtown Hartford, Connecticut. In May, 2021, UConn began construction on a new 2,600-seat arena on its Storrs campus that will be home to both the Huskies men's and women's hockey programs upon its opening, planned for the 2022–23 season.

Season
UConn entered the season looking to post their first winning record since 2013. Though they had been trending upwards in recent years, the Huskies were still picked to finish in the middle of the standings. The biggest question early was which goaltender would take over for the departed Tomáš Vomáčka. Graduate Darion Hanson, who had transferred to UConn the year before, won the job and held the position for the duration of the season. Hanson proved to be a stabilizing force in goal, and kept Connecticut in contention for most of the season.

The biggest impediment to the Huskies was the poor non-conference record for their entire conference which downgraded the team's overall strength of schedule. While UConn won most of their games against unranked opponents, a middling record against ranked teams did the Huskies no favors and the team was a long shot to make the tournament at the end of January. A 4-game winning streak in February briefly put the team in the top-20, but the Huskies followed that by losing four out of five games near the end of the regular season.

Though UConn was guaranteed to finish with a winning record at the beginning of the playoff, they also knew that they had no chance to make the NCAA tournament without a conference championship. Hanson played masterfully in the quarterfinal game, stopping 38 shots from Boston University. In the semifinal the offense took over and triumphed over top-seeded Northeastern. Suddenly, the Huskies found themselves just 1 win away from the program's first NCAA tournament appearance. All they had to do now was defeat the defending national champions, Massachusetts. Hanson was again a brick wall in goal, turning aside all but one shot in regulation. The rest of the team, however, was outplayed by the Minutemen and could only hold on to force overtime. UMass ended the game on their first shot of overtime and ended the Huskies' season.

Despite the sour end, UConn recorded 20 wins for the first time in 24 years. Combined with their strong performances against the top teams in their conference, this was objectively the best season in the history of the program.

Departures

Recruiting

Roster
As of August 12, 2021.

Standings

Schedule and results

|-
!colspan=12 style=";" | Regular Season

|-
!colspan=12 ! style=""; | 

|-
!colspan=12 style=";" |

Scoring statistics

Goaltending statistics

Rankings

Note: USCHO did not release a poll in week 24.

Awards and honors

Players drafted into the NHL

2022 NHL Entry Draft

† incoming freshman

References

2021-22
2021–22 Hockey East men's ice hockey season
2021–22 NCAA Division I men's ice hockey by team
2021 in sports in Connecticut
2022 in sports in Connecticut